Rema-Kalenga Wildlife Sanctuary is a protected forest and wildlife sanctuary in Bangladesh. This is a dry and evergreen forest . It is located in the Chunarughat of Habiganj district. Rema-Kalenga Wildlife Sanctuary was established in 1982 and later expanded in 1996. Currently the wildlife sanctuary expands on an area of 1795.54 hectares as of 2009. This is one of the natural forests in Bangladesh that are still in good condition. However, indiscriminate theft of trees & deforestation pose threat on the sanctuary.

Location and area
Rema-Kalenga Wildlife Sanctuary is located in Chunarughat upazila of Habiganj. It is in very near to  Srimangal of Moulvibazar district and adjacent to the Tripura border of India. The wildlife sanctuary is about 130 kilometers north-east of the capital Dhaka. It comprises four bits of Kalenga Forest Range of Habiganj District namely: Kalenga, Rema, Chanbari and Rashidpur.

Biodiversity
Rema-Kalenga wildlife sanctuary is rich in rare species plants & animals. The forest currently has 37 species of mammals, 167 species of birds, seven species of amphibian, 18 species of reptiles and 638 species of plants. Specially, the forest is well known for a variety of rare bird species, like  - racket tailed drongo, parrots, Hill Myna, Red Headed Trogon, Red Whiskered Bulbul, White-rumped Vulture, Kalij Pheasant, Red Jungle Fowl, owl, kingfisher, eagle, etc.

The three species of monkeys live in are: Kullu, lajjabati Resas monkey and night monkeys. Moreover, there are five species kathabirali. Of rare species in the Malay banei found at the kathabirali only. Among the more significant wildlife mukhapora Hanuman, Hanuman glasses, ulluka, Maya deer, mechobagha, banyasukara, fitch, weasel, hedgehog, etc.. Cobra, paradise flycatcher, damrasa, etc. laudaga with eighteen species of snake in the forest can be found

According to the locals, Tigers and Leopards were common back in the 1960s. But since 1971, there has been no certain tiger sightings. However very rare occasional reports of Leopards surface but these are more likely to be stray individuals of bordering Indian forest.  Also Dholes or Asiatic Wild Dogs are extinct since 90s. At present different types of small wild cats and jackals are main terrestrial predators of the forest.

See also 
 Sangu Wildlife Sanctuary

References

External links 

Wildlife sanctuaries of Bangladesh
Forests of Bangladesh
Habiganj District
Protected areas established in 1982
1982 establishments in Bangladesh
Lower Gangetic Plains moist deciduous forests